Dream with the Fishes is a 1997 American independent film directed by Finn Taylor. The film is Taylor's directorial debut and starred David Arquette, Kathryn Erbe and Brad Hunt. It was released on June 20, 1997, by Sony Pictures Classics.

Plot
The film follows Terry, a suicidal voyeur who doesn't seem to be able to kill himself. While preparing for jumping off a bridge, he meets Nick who ends up saving his life. Terry discovers that Nick is terminally ill and doesn't have much time left. Scared by the lack of time, Nick offers Terry a deal he can't refuse: Terry will become the beneficiary of Nick's life insurance or, since money doesn't matter to Terry, Nick promises to kill him before he dies. All Nick asks is Terry's help to realize a few fantasies before dying.

Taylor has claimed that the film is loosely autobiographical. Taylor himself once spent six years traveling around the country with a friend.  In one interview, Taylor claimed: "When I was 19, I contemplated suicide and attempted to hold up a drug store."

Cast
David Arquette as Terry
Kathryn Erbe as Liz
Brad Hunt as Nick
Cathy Moriarty as Aunt Elise
J. E. Freeman as Joe
Patrick McGaw as Don
Timi Prulhiere as Michelle
Anita Barone as Mary
Allyce Beasley as Sophia

Production
It was shot in San Francisco and in other locations around Northern California.

Release and reception
Dream with the Fishes debuted at the Sundance Film Festival, and would go on to earn $460,000 in limited release in June 1997. In Australia, it also received a limited theatrical release in October 1997.

The film received a relatively positive reception from critics. Roger Ebert said that the film "shows some of the signs of unchained ambition."  The Los Angeles Times said that "of all the towering blockbusters this summer, Dream With The Fishes has more heart than the lot of them." In a 2007 interview, actor David Arquette stated that Dream with the Fishes was "close to my heart" and "a great independent film."

Rotten Tomatoes gives the film a rating of 61% from 44 reviews.

Notes

External links
 
 

1997 films
American independent films
Films about drugs
Films set in San Francisco
1997 comedy-drama films
American comedy-drama films
1997 independent films
1990s English-language films
1990s American films